West Chicago is a city in DuPage County, Illinois, United States. The population was 27,086 at the 2010 census. It was formerly named Junction and later Turner, after its founder, John B. Turner, president of the Galena and Chicago Union Railroad (G&CU) in 1855. The city was initially established around the first junction of railroad lines in Illinois, and today is still served by the  Metra service via West Chicago station.

Geography

History

Erastus Gary, of Pomfret, Connecticut, homesteaded  on the banks of the DuPage River, just south of West Chicago's present day city limits in the 1830s. His son became "Judge" Elbert Henry Gary, the first CEO of America's first billion-dollar corporation, U.S. Steel, and for whom Gary, Indiana, is named. Gary also helped bring brothers Jesse and Warren Wheaton, founders of nearby Wheaton, Illinois, the DuPage County seat, from Connecticut to the Midwest. A pioneer cemetery on the old Gary Homestead, where a sawmill had been built by the Garys, just north of Gary's Mill Road, and north of its terminus at Illinois Route 59, was built over with apartment buildings in the 1960s.

In 1849, the Galena and Chicago Union Railroad (predecessor of the C&NW) reached the site of present-day West Chicago, then continued northwest to Elgin. In 1850, the Aurora Branch Railroad (predecessor of the CB&Q) built southwest, making America's first railroad junction point west of Chicago. In 1854, the G&CURR opened the “Dixon Air Line” branch West thru Geneva.

Because of the number of trains passing through town, water and fuel facilities for locomotives and a roundhouse were built here, as well as an early eating-house and hotel for travelers. As a result, a number of new employees and their families located to this community. The original settlers were primarily English and Irish, with Germans arriving in the 1860s and Mexican immigrants by the 1910s. John B. Turner, president of the G&CU and a resident of Chicago, owned several acres of land in what is now the center of town. As more people settled in Junction, Turner recognized the chance to make a profit by platting his land and selling off lots. He therefore recorded the community's first plat in 1855 under the name of Town of Junction.

The community continued its growth, although the one-room schoolhouse built a mile outside town in 1835 would become the state's last surviving one-room schoolhouse when it closed in 1991. Meanwhile, in 1857, Dr. Joseph McConnell and his wife Mary platted a second portion of town just north of John B. Turner's plat. They recorded their plat as the Town of Turner in honor of the railroad president. These two “towns” became informally known as Turner Junction.

By 1873, the community had taken on a substantial and permanent character, so the residents incorporated as the Village of Turner. In 1888, a new railroad, the Elgin, Joliet & Eastern, built a freight line through town. It offered free factory sites for any industry willing to locate along its right-of-way. As part of the effort to attract industry, the community changed its name in 1896 to the Village of West Chicago. Area businessmen, particularly Charles Bolles, reasoned that the new name sounded more cosmopolitan, and would help draw prospective factory owners.

As industry located in West Chicago and new jobs opened up, the population increased. At the turn of the century, West Chicago was number two in population in DuPage County, behind Hinsdale. By 1910, the population was 2,378 and several new industries had located here, including the Borden's milk condensing plant, the Turner Cabinet Company and the Turner Brick Company. The community continues to attract quality business and residential development that contributes to the culturally diverse community that exists today.

In 1909, one more railroad came to West Chicago. The Chicago, Wheaton and Western Railway, a lightly built interurban electric railway, came in from the east, running down the middle of Junction and Depot (now both Main) streets, then curved back west toward Geneva. Soon bought by the Chicago Aurora and Elgin Railroad, the “country trolley” was lightly used, and abandoned in 1937. The right of way is now the Geneva Spur of the Illinois Prairie Path.

In the 1980s and 1990s, the city received a nuclear-waste contamination scare. Harmful waste from the Rare Earths Facility had been spread around the community since the 1930s, when the Lindsay Light and Chemical Company built a plant. Reed-Keppler Park was built on top of a landfill that had received some waste from the plant. Kerr-McGee, which had bought the facility in 1967 and operated it until 1973, settled with the city, and cleaned up the waste.

The movie Reach the Rock, written by John Hughes, was filmed in downtown West Chicago in 1998.

Government

The United States Postal Service operates the West Chicago Post Office.

As of 2021, Ruben Pineda is the mayor of West Chicago.

The city maintains the West Chicago Public Library downtown.

Demographics
As of the 2020 census there were 25,614 people, 7,838 households, and 6,035 families residing in the city. The racial makeup of the city was 40.99% White, 2.92% African American, 2.18% Native American, 8.04% Asian, 0.02% Pacific Islander, 28.85% from other races, and 17.00% from two or more races. Hispanic or Latino of any race were 51.85% of the population.

There were 7,838 households, out of which 81.09% had children under the age of 18 living with them, 58.68% were married couples living together, 12.75% had a female householder with no husband present, and 23.00% were non-families. 19.32% of all households were made up of individuals, and 6.74% had someone living alone who was 65 years of age or older. The average household size was 3.92 and the average family size was 3.40.

The city's age distribution consisted of 28.0% under the age of 18, 11.0% from 18 to 24, 25.4% from 25 to 44, 26.4% from 45 to 64, and 9.2% who were 65 years of age or older. The median age was 34.0 years. For every 100 females, there were 98.0 males. For every 100 females age 18 and over, there were 96.3 males.

The median income for a household in the city was $77,098, and the median income for a family was $88,509. Males had a median income of $39,214 versus $27,870 for females. The per capita income for the city was $30,245. About 9.3% of families and 10.5% of the population were below the poverty line, including 16.2% of those under age 18 and 4.5% of those age 65 or over.

Economy
Jel Sert has its corporate headquarters in West Chicago.

Ball Horticultural Company has its Worldwide Headquarters in West Chicago.

General Mills had a production facility in West Chicago until 2017.

Top employers
According to the City's 2017 Comprehensive Annual Financial Report, the top employers in the city are:

Education
The city of West Chicago has two high schools—one public school, West Chicago Community High School, and one private, Wheaton Academy. There are seven public elementary schools (Currier, Pioneer, Wegner, Turner, Indian Knoll, Gary, and Norton Creek) and two middle schools [Benjamin and Leman Middle School (LMS)] within the city. The West Chicago Wildcats is the name of the WCCHS teams.

Transportation

The DuPage Airport is located in the city. The National Transportation Safety Board operates the Chicago Aviation Field Office in West Chicago, on the grounds of the airport; it is the regional headquarters of the NTSB Aviation Central Region.

Metra has a station on the Union Pacific West Line and another is being planned on the STAR Line on North Avenue.

Points of interest
West Chicago is home to the Truitt-Hoff Nature Preserve, part of DuPage County’s West Chicago Prairie Forest Preserve, one of the largest and best preserved prairies in the Midwest. This prairie was discovered by then-mayor Richard Truitt in 1976 during one of his frequent walks in the open land west of the city. The prairie had been preserved because it was on railroad right-of-way land that had never been cultivated.

The city is also home to Kline Creek Farm, an 1890s living history farm. as well as the West Chicago City Museum, located in a historic building that once served as Town Hall.

Sister city
West Chicago has one sister city.:
 - Taufkirchen, Bavaria, Germany

References

External links

 
 West Chicago Community High School Web Site
 Encyclopedia of Chicago History
 WegoNews, Micro-Gateway for the City of West Chicago
 West Chicago Fire Protection District Web Site

 
1873 establishments in Illinois
Chicago metropolitan area
Cities in Illinois
Populated places established in 1873
Cities in DuPage County, Illinois